The Guia Hill Cable Car is an aerial gondola lift system at Guia Hill, Macau peninsula, Macau, China. The system connects Jardim da Flora with Parque Municipal da Colina da Guia. It opened in 1997 and has nine cars (each holding four passengers). Visitors can gain a bird's-eye view of the garden and a panoramic perspective of the city. The ride takes 80 seconds.

Ticket prices and operating hours
, one way adult ticket price is MOP$2, return is MOP$3. Special discount return ticket at MOP$2 is available to children aged 12 or below and older adults aged 65 or above. Opening hours are from 8 am to 6 pm. It is closed on Mondays.

See also
 List of tourist attractions in Macau

References

External links
Cable Car page at the website of the Macao Government Tourism Office

Gondola lifts
Tourist attractions in Macau
Transport in Macau
Buildings and structures completed in 1997
1997 establishments in Macau